Santa Clara High School is a comprehensive, co-educational, public high school located in Santa Clara, California, United States. It is one of four high schools in the Santa Clara Unified School District (SCUSD).

History
The school started in 1872 in downtown Santa Clara at 270 Washington Street. In 1981, Buchser High School (opened 1960, at 3000 Benton Street) was closed, and "Santa Clara High School" moved to the vacated Buchser High location on Benton Street. Concurrently, the 270 Washington Street location became the campus of the new Buchser Middle School. 

With the move, Santa Clara High dropped its "Panther" mascot and adopted the former Buchser High's "Bruin" mascot.

The original school handled grades 9-12, with the middle schools of the district taking grades 7-8. Jefferson Middle School (3585 Monroe Street) was closed in 1989, and the campus sold.  Juan Cabrillo Middle School (2550 Cabrillo Avenue) was closed in 1982 (due to declining enrollment), and then reopened in 1992.

Swimming
San Jose State University Alumnus George Haines formed the Santa Clara Swim Club on campus in 1950.  By 1960, seven swimmers from the club had qualified for the Olympics.  The success of the club attracted swimmers to the high school.  As a result of the club, the original Santa Clara High School was responsible for assembling the most Olympic gold medalists from a single high school.

Notable alumni

Mark Spitz - 2nd in all-time total golds in any Olympics- Olympic gold medal swimmer
Margaret Jenkins - pioneer in women's sports/world class track and field/Olympic competitor
Nino Bongiovanni - Major League Baseball outfielder
Joe Bottom - Olympic silver medalist; two-time world record holder; Swimming Hall of Fame
Donna De Varona - Olympic gold medal swimmer
George Haines - USA, Olympic, and UCLA swimming coach
Claudia Kolb - Olympic gold medal swimmer
Mike Garzoni - NFL football guard
Ken Powell - chairman, General Mills
Harry Lew - former U.S. Marine
Don Schollander - Olympic gold medal swimmer
Heather Simmons-Carrasco - Olympic gold medalist in synchronized swimming
Carol Speed - actress

References

External links
Official site of school
 Who’s Who in Santa Clara Unified? - List of notable alumni from the school district
California School Recognition Program

High schools in Santa Clara County, California
Public high schools in California
Education in Santa Clara, California
1872 establishments in California